The Institut Congolais pour la Conservation de la Nature (English; "Congolese Institute for Nature Conservation") is a Congolese governmental partner tasked with the protection and conservation of the Virunga National Park and Kahuzi-Biega National Park, both UNESCO World Heritage Sites in the Democratic Republic of Congo. Members of the ICCN are charged with the overall protection of the parks and the endangered mountain gorilla. The ICCN works with various national and international NGO partners.

References

External links
 
http://www.fieldmuseum.org/congo/insticcn.html
 The Dian Fossey Gorilla Fund

Government of the Democratic Republic of the Congo
Universities in the Democratic Republic of the Congo